Ambolofoty is a town and commune in Madagascar. It belongs to the district of Toliara II, which is a part of Atsimo-Andrefana Region. The town is situated at the  Onilahy River. The population of the commune was estimated to be approximately 8,000 in 2001 commune census.

Only primary schooling is available. The majority 66% of the population of the commune are farmers, while an additional 30% receives their livelihood from raising livestock. The most important crop is sweet potatoes, while other important products are maize, lima beans and cowpeas.  Services provide employment for 2% of the population. Additionally fishing employs 2% of the population.

See also
Anakao

References and notes 

Populated places in Atsimo-Andrefana